Gustave Maria Blanche (30 April 1849 – 26 July 1916) was a French-Canadian Roman Catholic priest, Bishop, and Vicar Apostolic of Golfe St-Laurent (now Baie-Comeau).

Born in Josselin, Diocese de Vannes, France, the son of L. Blanche and Marie Hayard, Blanche was called to the Bar in France. In 1870, he was a volunteer in the Franco-Prussian War. In 1873, he joined the Eudists. He was ordained a priest in 1878. From 1878 to 1890, he was the director of the Ecole St. Jean in Versailles. From 1890 to 1899, he was director of the College Church Point, Nova Scotia. In 1905, he was appointed Titular Bishop of Sicca Veneria and Vicar Apostolic of Golfe St-Laurent.

References

 
 
 

1849 births
1916 deaths
20th-century Roman Catholic bishops in Canada
French emigrants to Canada
People from Vannes
French Roman Catholic priests
Roman Catholic bishops of Baie-Comeau
Roman Catholic titular bishops